is a 1994 Japanese film directed by Masaru Konuma. The film stars Makiko Kuno, Johnny Okura and Kōji Shimizu. The movie was licensed in the US by Central Park Media and was released under their Asia Pulp Cinema label.

Plot
Beautiful as she is deadly, Shion is the most merciless assassin of the Magnificat crime group. But when her hand and heart hesitate to murder the man she loves, her superiors mark her for death! Torn from the crime lords who were her only family, Shion must choose between a life of killing and a life on the run.

Cast
 Makiko Kuno as Shion
 Johnny Okura as Ito
 Koji Shimizu as Father
 Maiko Kazama as Mitsuko
 Katsuo Tokashiki as Man 7
 Kenji Mitamura 
 Ryohei Takaoka

English Voice Cast
The English dub was produced by Matlin Recording in New York City.

 Candi Snackwell as Shion
 Haywood Jab as Ito
 Joseph Stills as Father
 Cariola as Mitsuko
 Tom Wilson as Man 7
 Sonny Dey as Maid
 Yotee

See also 
Naked Killer

References

External links
 

1994 films
Central Park Media
1990s erotic thriller films
Films shot in Japan
Japanese erotic thriller films
Girls with guns films
1990s Japanese films